Loch Ossian (Scottish Gaelic: "Loch Oisein") is a narrow loch that is about  long on the north eastern edge of Rannoch Moor, on The Corrour Estate, with its western corner  east of Corrour railway station. It is drained by the River Ossian, flowing north into Loch Guilbinn and ultimately to the River Spean at Moy.

Loch Ossian is remote from public roads, and the nearest access is from Corrour railway station. On its banks near the western end of the loch stands Loch Ossian youth hostel, which belongs to the Scottish Youth Hostels Association (SYHA). The hostel was recently restored as an 'eco-hostel', boasting wind and solar power, and grey water and dry toilet systems. At the eastern end of the loch is Corrour Lodge.

References

Lochs of Highland (council area)
Freshwater lochs of Scotland
Lochy Basin